The Murcia tournament is the previous round of the Copa RFEF in the Region of Murcia. Organized by the Football Federation of the Region of Murcia, the Murcia teams in Segunda División B and the best teams of the Tercera División (Group 13) not qualified to the Copa del Rey play this tournament, including farm teams.

It is usually played between July and October, and the champion of the tournament qualifies to the National tournament of the Copa RFEF. Since 1999, the final is played in only one game and since 2001, the qualifying round is composed by four groups of three teams.

FC Cartagena is the team with most titles.

History

Champions

References

External links

Football in the Region of Murcia
Murcia